Kaman or Kamaban is an old town with an interesting past. It is famous for having two peeths of vallabhacharyaji mahaprabhuji. Hence, it is an important place for vaishnaivas of shuddhadwait pushtimarg. Though it is located towards the north of Bharatpur district in Rajasthan,also it forms a part of the Braj Bhoomi, which is related to the childhood and pastimes of Lord Krishna.

Geography

It borders the states of Haryana to the west and Uttar Pradesh to the North. 

Kaman has abundant foliage of Tulsi plants, which has earned it the epithet, Adi Vrindavan. It is a magnet for Vaishnava devotees, who throng the town for Van Yatra during the auspicious month of Bhadon. In the medieval times, Kaman has served as a home to the Jat and Mughal rulers. Kaman is also known as Mewat and Kadambawana due to the presence of plenty of Kadamba trees within its periphery.

Temple of Gokulchandramaji and Madanmohanji
Kaman is the town holding two of the vallabhachrya mahaprabhuji's Shuddhadvaita peeths. One is 5th peeth, also known as shri gokulchandramaji temple and the 7th peeth known as madanmohanji mandir. In both temples the current gadipatis are of lineage of shri vallabhacharyaji mahaprabhu.

other temples
Kaman is considered to be a very old and sacred town for Hindus as it forms part of ‘ Braj’ (or ‘ Brij) area, where Lord Krishna is believed to have spent his early life. The local men believe that King Kamasen, the grandfather of Lord Krishna, renamed this town, formerly known as Brahampore. Some of the significant temple shrines of Rajasthan other than of pushtimarg of vallabh sampraday are present in Kaman such as the Kameswara Mahadeva Siva Temple, Govindaji Temple, Vimala Kunda and Chaurasi Khamba Temple.

Kaman is ruled by the number 84. There are 84 ponds, 84 temples and 84 hectares of land that is divided into 84 small pools of water.

Located to the west of Kaman township in Bharatpur district is the Chaurasi Khamba temple (84 pillared temple). There is no idol worship, or for that matter, worship of any kind, performed at this site; yet, it is called a temple. Chaurasi Khamba is an ancient monument having 84 intricately carved pillars, but none has been able to count the exact number yet! Every time a curious visitor has attempted to count the pillars of the temple, the total number has either receded or exceeded the exact number. For this reason, Chaurashi Khamba is considered spooky.

History
Legend also states that Lord Krishna had lived for a brief span in this monument during his childhood. Even the Pandava brothers had spent some part of the term of their exile in the forests before the Mahabharata war. Additionally, the locals believed that there is a pond close by, named Dharam Kund where the deity of Justice, Yama, had tested Yudhisthira’s wisdom by assuming the form of a Yaksha.

Some men also believe that in his lifetime, King Vikramaditya, held his court at Chaurasi Khamba, though it is hard to tell whether it is just heresy or true.

See also
 Pinangwan
 Indragarh

References

Cities and towns in Bharatpur district